Thomas Hettche  (born 30 November 1964 in Treis, Hesse) is a German author.

Hettche completed his Abitur at the Liebigschule Giessen, He studied German studies and philosophy at the Johann Wolfgang Goethe University in Frankfurt am Main and completed his PhD in philosophy.

What We Are Made Of, an English translation by Shaun Whiteside of Hettche's novel Woraus wir gemacht sind (2006), was published by Picador in Britain in July 2008, and in the United States in October 2010. Since 2018, he has been honorary professor at the TU Berlin.

Hettche lives in Berlin.

Awards
 1990 Rauris Literature Prize
 2014 Wilhelm Raabe Literature Prize
 2015 Solothurner Literaturpreis
 2018 Hermann-Hesse-Literaturpreis
 2019 Joseph-Breitbach-Preis

Memberships
 1999 PEN Centre Germany
 2019 Academy of Arts, Berlin

Bibliography

English translation

Thesis

Notes

External links

 
 
 Times Literary Supplement review of What We Are Made Of, by Paul Owen

1964 births
Living people
People from Giessen (district)
20th-century German novelists
21st-century German novelists
Writers from Hesse
German male novelists
20th-century German male writers
21st-century German male writers